Kevin Ward (born 5 August 1957) is an English former professional rugby league footballer who played in the 1970s, 1980s and 1990s. Ward was inducted into the Castleford Tigers Hall of Fame.

Background
Ward was born in Wakefield, West Riding of Yorkshire, England.

Playing career

At club level, arguably his biggest career highlights were winning the 1986 Challenge Cup with Castleford, the 1987 NSWRL Premiership with Manly, and the 1992 Lancashire County Cup with St. Helens.

Ward played at left-, i.e. number 8, in Castleford's 15-14 victory over Hull Kingston Rovers in the 1986 Challenge Cup Final during the 1985–86 season at Wembley Stadium, London on Saturday 3 May 1986.

Ward was selected to go on the 1988 Great Britain Lions tour. He was named man-of-the-match in the first Ashes Test. It was announced during the tour that Ward would rejoin Manly-Warringah for the remainder of their season once the tour was completed.

Ward won caps for Great Britain in 1984 against France, in 1986 against Australia (2 matches), in 1986 in the 1985–1988 Rugby League World Cup against Australia, in 1987 in the 1985–1988 Rugby League World Cup against Papua New Guinea, in 1988 against France (2 matches), in 1988 in the 1985–1988 Rugby League World Cup against Papua New Guinea, Australia (2 matches), in 1988 in the 1985–1988 Rugby League World Cup against Australia, and New Zealand, in 1989 against France (2 matches), in 1990 against Australia (2 matches), and in 1992 in the 1989–1992 Rugby League World Cup against Australia. His last international appearance was in the 1992 World Cup Final against Australia at Wembley Stadium, London.

His career ended on 9 April 1993 (Good Friday) at Central Park, the old home of Wigan while playing for St Helens where Ward sustained a badly broken leg. He almost lost his leg in the weeks that followed. Even now he can't walk long distances, let alone run.

County Cup Final appearances
Kevin Ward played right-, i.e. number 12, in Castleford's 10-5 victory over Bradford Northern in the 1981 Yorkshire County Cup Final during the 1981–82 season at Headingley Rugby Stadium, Leeds, on Saturday 3 October 1981, played left-, i.e. number 8, in the 18-22 defeat by Hull Kingston Rovers in the 1985 Yorkshire County Cup Final during the 1985–86 season at Headingley Rugby Stadium, Leeds, on Sunday 27 October 1985, played left-, and scored a try in the 31-24 victory over Hull F.C. in the 1986 Yorkshire County Cup Final during the 1986–87 season at Headingley Rugby Stadium, Leeds, on Saturday 11 October 1986, played right-, i.e. number 10, in the 12-12 draw with Bradford Northern in the 1987 Yorkshire County Cup Final during the 1987–88 season at Headingley Rugby Stadium, Leeds, on Saturday 17 October 1987, played left- in the 2-11 defeat by Bradford Northern in the 1987 Yorkshire County Cup Final replay during the 1987–88 season at Elland Road, Leeds, on Saturday 31 October 1987, played left- in the 12-33 defeat by Leeds in the 1988 Yorkshire County Cup Final during the 1988–89 season at Elland Road, Leeds, on Sunday 16 October 1988, played right- in St. Helens' 24-14 victory over Rochdale Hornets in the 1991 Lancashire County Cup Final during the 1991–92 season at Wilderspool Stadium, Warrington, on Sunday 20 October 1991, and played right- in the 4-5 defeat by Wigan in the 1992 Lancashire County Cup Final during the 1992–93 season at Knowsley Road, St Helens, on Sunday 18 October 1992.

References

External links
!Great Britain Statistics at englandrl.co.uk (statistics currently missing due to not having appeared for both Great Britain, and England)
(archived by web.archive.org) Biography review at rl1908.com
Profile at saints.org.uk

1957 births
Living people
Castleford Tigers players
English rugby league players
Great Britain national rugby league team players
Manly Warringah Sea Eagles players
Rugby league hookers
Rugby league locks
Rugby league players from Wakefield
Rugby league props
Rugby league second-rows
St Helens R.F.C. players
Yorkshire rugby league team players